Tugrah is a rural locality in the local government area (LGA) of Devonport in the North-west and west LGA region of Tasmania. The 2021 census recorded a population of 470 for the state suburb of Tugrah.
It is a suburb of Devonport, Tasmania, located on the south western side of the city.

History 
Tugrah was gazetted as a locality in 1962. The name is believed to be an Aboriginal word meaning “to eat”.

Geography
The Don River forms part of the south-western boundary, before flowing through to the north-west, where it then forms the north-western boundary.

Road infrastructure
National Route 1 (Bass Highway) passes to the north-east. From there, Tugrah Road provides access to the locality.

References

Suburbs of Devonport, Tasmania